Thomas White Mulkey (born October 16, 1972) is an American cyclist. He competed at the 2000 Summer Olympics in Sydney, in the men's team pursuit. Mulkey was born in Atlanta, Georgia.

References

External links

1972 births
Living people
American male cyclists
Olympic cyclists of the United States
Cyclists at the 2000 Summer Olympics
Pan American Games medalists in cycling
Pan American Games gold medalists for the United States
American track cyclists
Cyclists at the 1999 Pan American Games